Nazira Karodia  is a chemist, Professor of Science Education and Pro-Vice Chancellor for Regional Development at the University of Wolverhampton. She works on organic synthesis, green chemistry, heterocyclic compounds and science education.

Early life and education 
Karodia was born and grew up in South Africa under apartheid. Like most people not of European origin, she suffered from racial segregation during her schooling. She was able to study chemistry at the University of Natal, which had been only for white people, and she graduated in 1990. She left South Africa in 1992. Karodia completed her PhD at the University of St Andrews, working on phosphorus ylide supervised by Alan Aitken in 1995.

Career and research
Karodia joined the University of Florida as a fellow in the Centre for Heterocyclic Chemistry where she worked on developed Benzothiazines and Benzotriazoles. Karodia was appointed senior lecturer at the University of Bradford and made director for STEM in 1998. Here Karodia developed her interest in science education and science outreach programs that looked to benefit the local community. She was a senior member of the Higher Education Funding Council for England (HEFCE) STEM programme, where she was made Regional Director (Yorkshire, Humber and North East) of the National HE STEM programme. Her chemistry research focused on ionic liquids and liquid crystalline polymers. Karodia is part of the European Union funded GENOVATE project: Transforming organisational culture for gender equality in research and innovation.  She is also working on programmes to promote careers in science and engineering, especially for students from underrepresented parts of the community.

Since 2015 she has held the position of Professor of Science Education at the University of Wolverhampton and became Dean of the Faculty of Science and Engineering in 2016.  She has partnered with the Doaba Group of Colleges. In 2018 she launched a new partnerships health science course.

Awards and honours
Karodia received a commendation from the National Educational Opportunities Network (NEON) in 2015 for Outstanding Contribution to Widening Access. She was selected as one of the Royal Society of Chemistry's Top 175 Faces of Chemistry in 2016. In 2017 she was honoured at the ShruthiUK Birmingham Thyagaraja Festival with a Women-in-Science award. In 2015 she was elected a Fellow of the Royal Society of Chemistry (FRSC).

Karodia was appointed Member of the Order of the British Empire (MBE) in the 2022 New Year Honours for services to the chemical sciences.

Personal life
Karodia has twin daughters, both of whom studied physics at university. She lost one twin to sickle cell disease in 2012. The University of York, where she was a student, have an award in her honour.

References 

Year of birth missing (living people)
Living people
South African chemists
South African women chemists
University of Natal alumni
Alumni of the University of St Andrews
University of Florida faculty
Academics of the University of Wolverhampton
Academics of the University of Bradford
Members of the Order of the British Empire
South African emigrants to the United Kingdom
Naturalised citizens of the United Kingdom
British chemists
British women chemists